Communauté d'agglomération Beaune Côte et Sud (also: Communauté d'agglomération Beaune-Chagny-Nolay) is the communauté d'agglomération, an intercommunal structure, centred on the town of Beaune. It is located in the Côte-d'Or and Saône-et-Loire departments, in the Bourgogne-Franche-Comté region, eastern France. Created in 2007, its seat is in Beaune. Its area is 558.5 km2. Its population was 51,207 in 2019, of which 20,551 in Beaune proper.

Composition
The communauté d'agglomération consists of the following 53 communes, of which 5 in Saône-et-Loire:

Aloxe-Corton
Aubigny-la-Ronce
Auxey-Duresses
Baubigny
Beaune
Bligny-lès-Beaune
Bouilland
Bouze-lès-Beaune
Chagny
Change
Chassagne-Montrachet
Chaudenay
Chevigny-en-Valière
Chorey-les-Beaune
Combertault
Corberon
Corcelles-les-Arts
Corgengoux
Cormot-Vauchignon
Corpeau
Dezize-lès-Maranges
Ébaty
Échevronne
Ladoix-Serrigny
Levernois
Marigny-lès-Reullée
Mavilly-Mandelot
Meloisey
Merceuil
Meursanges
Meursault
Molinot
Montagny-lès-Beaune
Monthelie
Nantoux
Nolay
Paris-l'Hôpital
Pernand-Vergelesses
Pommard
Puligny-Montrachet
La Rochepot
Ruffey-lès-Beaune
Saint-Aubin
Sainte-Marie-la-Blanche
Saint-Romain
Santenay
Santosse
Savigny-lès-Beaune
Tailly
Thury
Val-Mont
Vignoles
Volnay

References

Beaune Cote et Sud
Beaune Cote et Sud
Beaune Cote et Sud